"Rainin'" is a song by American rock band Sponge. It was released in 1995 as the fourth single from their debut album Rotting Piñata.

Release and reception
It is the band's fourth highest-charting song on the Modern Rock Tracks chart, where it reached number 34. The song also reached number 18 on the Mainstream Rock Tracks chart.

Music video
The music video for "Rainin'" was released in 1995 and was directed by Doug Aitken.

Track listing

Charts

Personnel
 Vinnie Dombroski – lead vocals
 Joey Mazzola – guitar, backing vocals
 Mike Cross – guitar
 Tim Cross – bass
 Jimmy Paluzzi – drums

References

1995 songs
Sponge (band) songs